Jose Medina (born March 29, 1953) is an American educator and politician who served in the California State Assembly. He is a Democrat who represented the 61st Assembly District, which encompassed parts of northwestern Riverside County and includes the cities of Riverside, Moreno Valley, Perris and Mead Valley.

Medina was the Chair of the Higher Education Committee and a member of the California Latino Legislative Caucus and the California Legislative Jewish Caucus. Prior to being elected to the Assembly in 2012, he was a teacher at Riverside Poly High School and a Riverside Community College District Trustee.

In 2018, Jose Medina secured $9.7 million in state funds through a budget allocation in the 2019 State Budget, signed by former California Governor Jerry Brown to support the development of the Cheech Marin Center for Chicano Art, Culture and Industry of the Riverside Art Museum, also known as "The Cheech." The Cheech will reside in the City of Riverside and be a permanent home for Cheech Marin's collection of Chicano art, making it the most prominent collection of its kind in the United States.

2014 California State Assembly

2016 California State Assembly

2018 California State Assembly

2020 California State Assembly

References

External links 
 
 Campaign website
 Join California Jose Medina

Democratic Party members of the California State Assembly
Living people
1953 births
21st-century American politicians
Hispanic and Latino American state legislators in California
People from Riverside, California
University of California, Riverside alumni